Within Cosa Nostra a mandamento is traditionally a district of three geographically contiguous Mafia cosche
(families controlling a single land feud, or a city ward) in Sicily. A capomandamento represents the head of a territory, the mandamento, and is usually entitled to be part of the provincial Mafia Commission.

List of Mandamenti
Palermo - The city of Palermo is divided into 8 local mandamenti: Porta Nuova, Brancaccio, Boccadifalco, Passo di Rigano, Santa Maria di Gesù, Noce, Pagliarelli, Resuttana and San Lorenzo.

Province of Palermo - The province of Palermo is divided into 7 mandamenti: Camporeale (born from the merger of the mandamenti of Partinico and San Giuseppe Jato), Corleone, Cinisi, Bagheria, Trabia, Belmonte Mezzagno, San Mauro Castelverde.

Province of Agrigento - The province of Agrigento consists of 10 mandamenti: Agrigento, Santa Elisabetta, Porto Empedocle, Canicattì, Cianciana, Ribera, Sambuca di Sicilia, Casteltermini, Palma di Montechiaro and Campobello di Licata.

Province of Trapani - The province of Trapani consists of 4 mandamenti: Castelvetrano, Trapani, Mazara del Vallo and Alcamo.

Province of Caltanissetta - The province of Caltanissetta consists of 4 mandamenti: Gela, Vallelunga, Riesi and Mussomeli.

See also
List of Sicilian Mafia clans

References

Dickie, John (2004). Cosa Nostra. A history of the Sicilian Mafia, London: Coronet, 
Paoli, Letizia (2003). Mafia Brotherhoods: Organized Crime, Italian Style, New York: Oxford University Press  (Review by Klaus Von Lampe) (Review by Alexandra V. Orlova)

Organized crime terminology
History of the Sicilian Mafia